Lemon Cove is a census-designated place (CDP) in the San Joaquin Valley in Tulare County, California, United States. The population was 308 at the 2010 census, up from 298 at the 2000 census.

Geography and ecology
Lemon Cove is located at  (36.381425, -119.025917) near the confluence of Lime Kiln Creek and the Kaweah River.

There are numerous flora and fauna species in the vicinity of Lemon Cove. The local Lime Kiln Creek watershed contains many  wildflowers of numerous taxa; included in these are the yellow mariposa lily, Calochortus luteus.

Climate
Lemon Cove has a hot-summer Mediterranean climate (Csa) typical of the foothills of California's Central Valley with hot, dry summers and cool, wet winters.

Demographics

2010
The 2010 United States Census reported that Lemon Cove had a population of 308. The racial makeup of Lemon Cove was 261 (84.7%) White, 0 (0.0%) African American, 5 (1.6%) Native American, 3 (1.0%) Asian, 2 (0.6%) Pacific Islander, 12 (3.9%) from other races, and 25 (8.1%) from two or more races. Hispanic or Latino of any race were 76 persons (24.7%).

The Census reported that 308 people (100% of the population) lived in households, 0 (0%) lived in non-institutionalized group quarters, and 0 (0%) were institutionalized.

There were 120 households, out of which 39 (32.5%) had children under the age of 18 living in them, 53 (44.2%) were opposite-sex married couples living together, 19 (15.8%) had a female householder with no husband present, 7 (5.8%) had a male householder with no wife present.  There were 4 (3.3%) unmarried opposite-sex partnerships, and 0 (0%) same-sex married couples or partnerships. 37 households (30.8%) were made up of individuals, and 10 (8.3%) had someone living alone who was 65 years of age or older. The average household size was 2.57.  There were 79 families (65.8% of all households); the average family size was 3.16.

The population was spread out, with 82 people (26.6%) under the age of 18, 32 people (10.4%) aged 18 to 24, 58 people (18.8%) aged 25 to 44, 92 people (29.9%) aged 45 to 64, and 44 people (14.3%) who were 65 years of age or older.  The median age was 39.6 years. For every 100 females, there were 106.7 males.  For every 100 females age 18 and over, there were 107.3 males.

The homeowner vacancy rate was 0%; the rental vacancy rate was 6.0%.  202 people (65.6% of the population) lived in owner-occupied housing units and 106 people (34.4%) lived in rental housing units.

2000
As of the census of 2000, there were 298 people, 121 households, and 76 families residing in the CDP. The racial makeup of the CDP was 87.25% White, 0.67% African American, 4.70% Native American, 2.01% Asian, 4.70% from other races, and 0.67% from two or more races. Hispanic or Latino of any race were 12.08% of the population.

There were 121 households, out of which 26.4% had children under the age of 18 living with them, 52.1% were married couples living together, 7.4% had a female householder with no husband present, and 36.4% were non-families. 34.7% of all households were made up of individuals, and 9.1% had someone living alone who was 65 years of age or older.  The average household size was 2.46 and the average family size was 3.18.

In the CDP, the population was spread out, with 26.2% under the age of 18, 6.7% from 18 to 24, 26.8% from 25 to 44, 24.8% from 45 to 64, and 15.4% who were 65 years of age or older.  The median age was 39 years. For every 100 females, there were 101.4 males.  For every 100 females age 18 and over, there were 98.2 males.

The median income for a household in the CDP was $28,333, and the median income for a family was $36,607. Males had a median income of $20,938 versus $30,625 for females. The per capita income for the CDP was $16,200.  About 21.9% of families and 32.6% of the population were below the poverty line, including 54.2% of those under the age of eighteen and 16.7% of those 65 or over.

Government

Notable people
Willard Hershberger, baseball player.
Susan Peters, Actress

References

Census-designated places in Tulare County, California
Census-designated places in California
San Joaquin Valley